Marion Aizpors (née Calaklu) (born 18 February 1961) is a retired German swimmer who won three relay medals at the 1981 and 1989 European Aquatics Championships. She also competed at the 1988 Summer Olympics in the 50 m freestyle, 100 m backstroke, 4 × 100 m freestyle and 4 × 100 m medley and finished seventh in both relay events. During her career she won nine national freestyle and backstroke titles.

References

1961 births
Living people
German female swimmers
Swimmers at the 1988 Summer Olympics
Olympic swimmers of West Germany
European Aquatics Championships medalists in swimming
People from Ludwigsburg
Sportspeople from Stuttgart (region)